The rufous-throated fulvetta (Schoeniparus rufogularis) is a species of bird in the family Pellorneidae.
It is found in southeastern Asia from the Himalayas through Indochina to southwestern Cambodia.

Its natural habitat is subtropical or tropical moist lowland forest.

References

Collar, N. J. & Robson, C. 2007. Family Timaliidae (Babblers)  pp. 70 – 291 in; del Hoyo, J., Elliott, A. & Christie, D.A. eds. Handbook of the Birds of the World, Vol. 12. Picathartes to Tits and Chickadees. Lynx Edicions, Barcelona.

rufous-throated fulvetta
Birds of Northeast India
Birds of Cambodia
Birds of Laos
Birds of Myanmar
Birds of Vietnam
rufous-throated fulvetta
Taxonomy articles created by Polbot